Master Ernest Antwi Nyarko, known as Ernest Antwi or Ernest Nyarko (born 9 September 1995) is a Ghanaian footballer who most recently played for Aktobe.

Club career
He made his professional debut in the Segunda Liga for Desportivo das Aves on 8 August 2015 in a game against Sporting Covilhã.

In July 2017, Antwi went on trial with Russian Premier League side FC Rostov.

Antwi moved to Kazakhstan Premier League club Aktobe, but was released from his contract on 5 January 2023.

References

External links
 

1995 births
Footballers from Accra
Living people
Ghanaian footballers
Tudu Mighty Jets FC players
Ghanaian expatriate footballers
Expatriate footballers in Portugal
Ghanaian expatriate sportspeople in Portugal
Ukrainian Premier League players
Ukrainian First League players
Saudi First Division League players
Expatriate footballers in Ukraine
Ghanaian expatriate sportspeople in Ukraine
Expatriate footballers in Saudi Arabia
Ghanaian expatriate sportspeople in Saudi Arabia
Expatriate footballers in Kazakhstan
Ghanaian expatriate sportspeople in Kazakhstan
S.C. Farense players
C.D. Aves players
Liga Portugal 2 players
U.D. Leiria players
FC Rukh Lviv players
FC Lviv players
FC Aktobe players
Association football forwards
F.C. Oliveira do Hospital players